Buried Alive is a 1908 comedy novel by the British writer Arnold Bennett. In 1913 Bennett adapted it as a play The Great Adventure. This later provided the basis for the 1968 musical Darling of the Day.

Synopsis
Priam Farll, a reclusive but celebrated British painter, returns home and to avoid public interest adopts the identity of his recently deceased valet. In turn his servant is given a state funeral. Farll is able to establish a peaceful new life until, needing to raise money, he begins painting again. Soon his works come to the attention of a connoisseur art dealer, threatening his happy new existence.

Film adaptations
The story has been adapted three times by Hollywood, firstly in a 1921 silent film version The Great Adventure starring Lionel Barrymore and Doris Rankin. In 1933 the novel was turned into a sound film His Double Life, directed by Arthur Hopkins and starring Roland Young, Lillian Gish and Montagu Love; it was produced by Paramount Pictures. A second adaptation, Holy Matrimony, was made by Twentieth Century Fox and starred Monty Woolley, Gracie Fields and Laird Cregar.

References

Bibliography
 Goble, Alan. The Complete Index to Literary Sources in Film. Walter de Gruyter, 1999.

1908 British novels
Novels by Arnold Bennett
Novels set in London
British novels adapted into films
British comedy novels